The 27th Fajr International Film Festival held from 31 January to 10 February 2009 in Tehran, Iran.

Doubt (Varuzh Karim-Masihi, 2009) — which adapted from Shakespeare's Hamlet — was the festival's best film in "Competition of Iranian Cinema" and Snow (Aida Begić, 2008), a Bosnian film, was the festival's best film in "Competition of International Cinema".

Competition of Iranian Cinema

Tributes 

Opening ceremony of the festival's Competition of Iranian Cinema took place on 30 January 2009, at the Milad Tower in Tehran, Iran beginning at 7:45 p.m. IRST.

Following individuals tributed by Golden Plaque:
 Ebrahim Hatamikia  – Filmmaking occupations: director and screenwriter
   – Filmmaking occupations: producer and special effects supervisor
 Deceased Khosrow Shakibai  – Filmmaking occupations: actor
 Rasul Sadr Ameli  – Filmmaking occupations: producer, director and screenwriter
 Mahmoud Kalari  – Filmmaking occupations: cinematographer

Advertisement Competition 
Winners of Crystal Simorgh are listed first, highlighted in boldface and indicated with a double dagger.

Winners of secondary awards are listed second, highlighted in boldface and indicated with a dagger.

Contending for Simorgh 

Closing ceremony of the festival's Competition of Iranian Cinema took place on 10 February 2009, at the Ministry of Interior Hall in Tehran, Iran beginning at 7:25 p.m. IRST. The ceremony was televised by IRIB.

Awards and nominations of the Competition of Iranian Cinema sections are below:

Golden Simorgh

Audience Choice

Main Competition 

Non-nomination Crystal Simorgh

Films with multiple nominations and awards

The following 12 films received multiple nominations: 

The following 5 films received multiple awards:

New Vision 

Non-nomination Crystal Simorgh

Non-nominated Honorary Diploma
 Best Director: Masoud Naghashzadeh  – 

Additional Honorary Diploma
 Best Actor: Hamed Behdad  – 
 Best Actress:   – 
 Best Screenplay: Penniless  –  and Hadi Moghadamdoost
 Best Cinematography:   – Fereydoun Shirdel

Video-Cinema 

Non-nominated Honorary Diploma
 Best Director: Hassan Lafafian  – White Piece's Move

Eye of the Reality 

Non-nomination Crystal Simorgh

Special Asian Unity Prize 
"Special Asian Unity Prize" from Asian Parliamentary Assembly awarded to:
   –  (Iran, UAE and Germany)

Turquoise Road Prize 
"Turquoise Road Prize" had no winner. The prize scheduled to the Best Film from Economic Cooperation Organization countries, jointly with ECO Cultural Institute.

Path of the Prophets 
"Path of the Prophets" section awarded "Interfaith Award" to:
   – Ebrahim Forouzesh (Iran)

Moustapha Akkad's Special Prize 
"Golden Banner" in memorial of deceased Syrian director Moustapha Akkad, designed in order to persuade that part of the world cinema which has a respectful look at Islam and its greatness. The prize awarded to:
   – Rashid Masharawi (Palestine, Tunisia and Netherlands)

Non-competition sections 
Special Screenings, retrospectives and memorials

Ceremony information 
The Kingdom of Solomon (Shahriar Bahrani, 2010) removed from the festival's list of accepted films, due to incompleteness of post-production processes.

One of the most controversial events of the Iranian cinema's passed year was Golshifteh Farahani's appearance in Body of Lies (Ridley Scott, 2008). Because of her performance in a Hollywood film, Asghar Farhadi's About Elly faced preventing its screening at the Fajr International Film Festival. At last, President Mahmoud Ahmadinejad stepped in and ordered the removal of the obstacles.

Bahram Beyzai's  awarded by main prizes of the Fajr International Film Festival  while many of his plays and scripts had rejected for production permit by government, after the revolution.

Footnotes

Notes

References

Sources

External links 

  (English)
  (Persian)
 
 27th Fajr International Film Festival on SourehCinema (in Persian)

2009 film awards
Fajr International Film Festival ceremonies